Vida e Caffè is a privately-owned coffee shop franchise and supplier of beverage products in South Africa. The name vida e caffè mixes Portuguese for 'life' with Italian for 'and coffee'.

History
vida e caffè opened their first shop on Kloof Street, Cape Town, in October 2001. As of March 2020, including over 100 stores in the Western Cape Province, 100 in Gauteng, 20 in KwaZulu-Natal and 70 across the rest of South Africa. The brand also has 13 stores in Ghana, four in Mauritius and two in Zambia.

Locations 
As of May 2020, they have 350 stores; 330 throughout South Africa and 20 on the rest of the African continent.  A number of the stores are micro-operations located within business office spaces to cater office workers.  The presence of the company, its market share, and relatively low franchise costs have been noted as a reason why the American multinational coffee company Starbucks has had limited success in expanding in South Africa.  The company has a partnership with the South African branch of Shell to sell coffee at its petrol stations across the country.

References

Food and drink companies based in Cape Town
Companies established in 2001
Retail companies of South Africa
South African brands
Coffeehouses and cafés in South Africa